Boaden is a surname, and refer to:

Helen Boaden (born 1956), Former Director of BBC Radio
James Boaden (1762–1839), English biographer, dramatist, and journalist
John Boaden (1792/3–1839), English portrait painter, son of James Boaden
Russell Boaden, Australian Paralympic sailor from Australia